The  is a railway line operated by West Japan Railway Company (JR West) in Toyama Prefecture, Japan. It connects Takaoka with Johana.

Route data 
Operating Company: West Japan Railway Company (Services and tracks)
Distance: 
Track gauge: 
Stations: 14
Double-track: None
Electrification: Not electrified
Railway signalling: Special automatic occlusive (track circuit detection type)

Stations

History
The line was nationalised on 1 September 1920. The Chūetsu Line was renamed the Jōhana Line from 1 August 1942 following the incorporation of the Fushiki to Takaoka section into the Himi Line.

CTC signalling was commissioned over the entire line in 1983.

From 1 April 1987, with the privatization of JNR, the Jōhana Line came under the control of West Japan Railway Company (JR West).

On 14 March 2015, Shin-Takaoka station opened on the line to coincide with the extension of the Hokuriku Shinkansen to Kanazawa Station.

Former connecting lines
 Fukuno Station: The Tonami Railway opened a 7 km line to Tsuzawa in 1915, including a connection to the Hokuriku Main Line at Isurugi. The company merged with the Kaetsu Railway in 1919, which extended the line 13 km to Shogawa-Cho in 1922. The entire line was closed on 16 September 1972.

See also
 List of railway lines in Japan

References

External links

 Johanna and Himi Line information 

 
Rail transport in Toyama Prefecture
Lines of West Japan Railway Company
1067 mm gauge railways in Japan